Hugo Simón Fernández Díez (born 8 September 1930) is a Chilean basketball player. He competed in the men's tournament at the 1952 Summer Olympics.

References

External links

1930 births
Possibly living people
Chilean men's basketball players
Olympic basketball players of Chile
Basketball players at the 1952 Summer Olympics
Sportspeople from Santiago
20th-century Chilean people